Thomas A. Smith may refer to:

 Thomas Alexander Smith (1850–1932), American politician
 Thomas Assheton Smith I (1752–1828), English landowner
 Thomas Smith (scientist), the founder and former president of Seismic Micro-Technology